Happy Valley Shanghai is an amusement park in Shanghai, China. Opened on 16 August 2009, it is the fourth installation of the Happy Valley theme park chain.

Notable rides

Happy Valley Shanghai contains seven major areas, each with different themed zones, including Sunshine Beach, Happy Times, Typhoon Bay, Gold Mine Town, Ant Kingdom, Shanghai Beach and Shangri-la Woods. There are more than 100 attractions in the park. Notable rides include:

References 

2009 establishments in China
Amusement parks in Shanghai
Amusement parks opened in 2009
Shanghai